Nathan Kirk-Patrick Ferguson (born 6 October 2000) is an English professional footballer who plays as a defender for Premier League club Crystal Palace.

Club career

West Bromwich Albion
Ferguson joined West Bromwich Albion at the age of 8. On 21 December 2017, he signed his first professional contract with the club, a deal which secured his Hawthorns future until the summer of 2020.

He made his professional debut on 3 August 2019 as a starter in Albion’s opening day 2–1 victory against Nottingham Forest. He then rejected a new contract with West Brom and left the club on 30 June 2020.

Crystal Palace
Ferguson joined Crystal Palace on 21 July 2020 on a three-year deal.
Having joined Palace in July, Ferguson suffered from a serious knee injury which required him to have an MRI scan followed by a minor thigh injury in December of that year.

After a lengthy delay due to injury, Ferguson made his debut on 26 December 2021 in a 3-0 defeat to Tottenham Hotspur coming on as an 82nd-minute substitute for Tyrick Mitchell. He also made the bench for the games against Norwich City on 28 December 2021  and Brighton on 14 January 2022.

International career
Born in England, Ferguson is of Jamaican descent. In May 2018, he was called into England U18 squad to compete in the Panda Cup. In July 2018, he represented England U19 at the UEFA U19 Euro 2018.

Ferguson made his England U20 debut on 9 September 2019 during a 1–0 victory in Switzerland.

Career statistics

References

External links
Crystal Palace profile

2000 births
Living people
Footballers from Birmingham, West Midlands
English people of Jamaican descent
English footballers
England youth international footballers
Association football defenders
West Bromwich Albion F.C. players
English Football League players
Crystal Palace F.C. players